Mimms may refer to:

People

 Bobby Mimms
 Garnet Mimms
 Zerelda Mimms

Places

 South Mimms
 North Mymms

See also

 Mims (disambiguation)